Geometria (minor planet designation: 376 Geometria) is a main belt asteroid that was discovered by French astronomer Auguste Charlois on 18 September 1893 in Nice, France. It is classified as an S-type asteroid.

In 1983, 376 Geometria was observed photometrically from the Observatoire de Haute-Provence, producing an asymmetrical light curve that indicates a rotation period of 7.74 ± 0.02 hours with a brightness variation of 0.16 ± 0.01 in magnitude.

References

External links
 
 

Background asteroids
Geometria
Geometria
S-type asteroids (Tholen)
Sl-type asteroids (SMASS)
18930918